Harrisville (also called Harrisia or McCartyville) is an unincorporated community and ghost town located about  northwest of New Gretna within Bass River Township in Burlington County, New Jersey, United States, in the New Jersey Pine Barrens.

The first industry in the area of Harrisville comprised two sawmills on the Oswego River (New Jersey), built in about 1750 and 1760 respectively. In 1795, a mill for splitting logs was built at the present site of Harrisville by Isaac Potts. This business was not very successful, and about 1815 it was converted to a paper plant, powered by water brought by a canal from a dam on the Oswego River, a tributary of the Wading River. The town which was built around the factory was originally called McCartyville after the factory owner; when the Harris family bought the factory in 1855, the name was changed to Harrisville. Under the Harris family, Harrisville was a company town, with a grist mill, post office, company store, and free tenant homes for the workers of the paper mill. In 1914, a fire started in Harrisville and destroyed the entire town, leaving only ruins. Only the decayed ruins of this town exist today.

References

Further reading
Dellomo, Angelo.  Harrisville.  Angelo Publishing Company, 1977

Bass River Township, New Jersey
Company towns in New Jersey
Ghost towns in New Jersey
Populated places in the Pine Barrens (New Jersey)
Ruins in the United States
Unincorporated communities in Burlington County, New Jersey
Unincorporated communities in New Jersey